Ardie was a company in Nürnberg, Germany that manufactured motorcycles from 1919 until 1958. The company's name derives from that of its founder, Arno Dietrich.

At first Ardie made motorcycles with its own 288cc and 304cc single cylinder two-stroke engines. In 1925 the company switched to using engines from JAP in London, England. In the 1930s Ardie switched again to engines made by the German companies Bark and Kūchen.

In 1930, Ardie President Willy Bendit assigned German engineer Josef Ganz to build a prototype of a small Volkswagen according to his design. This Ardie-Ganz prototype was finished in September 1930 and achieved highly successful road-test results. The car featured a tubular chassis, mid-mounted engine, and independent wheel suspension with swing-axles at the rear.

In 1936 the company returned to making motorcycles with two-stroke engines of its own manufacture. During the Second World War the company made a model with Ardie's own design of 350cc twin-cylinder side-valve four-stroke engine. After the war the company made a range of single and twin-cylinder machines ranging from 172cc to 344cc.

External links
Ardie Owners' Club
Meisterdinger von Nürnberg Ardie webpages

Motorcycle manufacturers of Germany
Vehicle manufacturing companies established in 1919